Lupanov's (k, s)-representation, named after Oleg Lupanov, is a way of representing Boolean circuits so as to show that the reciprocal of the Shannon effect. Shannon had showed that almost all Boolean functions of n variables need a circuit of size at least 2nn−1. The reciprocal is that:

All Boolean functions of n variables can be computed with a circuit of at most 2nn−1 + o(2nn−1) gates.

Definition

The idea is to represent the values of a boolean function ƒ in a table of 2k rows, representing the possible values of the k first variables x1, ..., ,xk, and 2n−k columns representing the values of the other variables.

Let ƒi(x) = ƒ(x) iff x ∈ Ai.

External links 

 Course material describing the Lupanov representation
 An additional example from the same course material

Boolean algebra
Circuit complexity